Jealous of Shit and Shine is the third studio album by Shit and Shine, released on 9 November 2006 by Riot Season.

Legacy

Track listing

Personnel
Adapted from the Jealous of Shit and Shine liner notes.
Shit and Shine
 Craig Clouse – vocals, instruments

Release history

References

External links 
 
 Jealous of Shit and Shine at Bandcamp

2006 albums
Shit and Shine albums